Eli Moore House is a historic home located near High Point, Davidson County, North Carolina. It dates to the late-18th or early-19th century, and is a -story, hall-and-parlor plan, log dwelling with a rear wing.  The house measures 26 feet by 18 feet and sits on a fieldstone pier foundation.

It was added to the National Register of Historic Places in 1984.

References

Log houses in the United States
Houses on the National Register of Historic Places in North Carolina
Houses in Davidson County, North Carolina
National Register of Historic Places in Davidson County, North Carolina
Log buildings and structures on the National Register of Historic Places in North Carolina